The following is the list of European Judo Championships medalists in the sport of judo.

Men

Extra Lightweight
60 kg

Half Lightweight
65 kg (1979–1997)
66 kg (1998–)

Lightweight
63 kg (1966–1976)
71 kg (1977–1997)
73 kg (1998–)

See also
 List of Olympic medalists in judo
 List of World Judo Championships medalists

European Judo Championships
Europe
Europe
Judo